The Sounds of Tristan Psionic is the debut album by Canadian indie rock group Tristan Psionic. It was released in 1994 on Sonic Unyon, a record label started by three of the four members of the band. It was the second release, and the first full-length release, by Sonic Unyon.

Track listing
All songs written by Tristan Psionic (Sandy McIntosh, Gary "Wool" McMaster, Mark Milne, and Tim Potocic).
 "Black Psabbath Psong" – 3:10
 "The Nightmare Returns" – 4:01
 "25 Cents" – 2:50
 "?Sometimes" – 2:58
 "Pslop" – 1:25
 "Ketchup" – 3:31
 "Screamin' Beamin'" – 4:06
 "Let It Go" – 4:13
 "Transmission" – 6:13
 "Tee Hee" – 0:01

Tristan Psionic albums
1994 albums